Cecil Irton Wylde (28 January 1904 – 11 November 1994) was a British ice hockey player. He competed in the men's tournament at the 1928 Winter Olympics.  He graduated from Harvard College and University of Cambridge.

References

External links
 

1904 births
1994 deaths
Ice hockey players at the 1928 Winter Olympics
Olympic ice hockey players of Great Britain
Sportspeople from Brookline, Massachusetts
Ice hockey players from Massachusetts
Harvard College alumni
Alumni of the University of Cambridge